Maronia celadon is the only species in the  monotypic moth genus Maronia of the family Erebidae. It is known from French Guiana. Both the genus and species were first described by Schaus in 1916.

References

Herminiinae
Monotypic moth genera